Musashigawa is an elder name in sumo, and may refer to:

Musashigawa stable
Musashigawa stable, a stable established in 2013
Fujishima stable (2010), known as Musashigawa stable from 1981 until 2010
Musashigawa oyakata
Musashimaru Kōyō, known as Musashigawa oyakata from 2013
Mienoumi Tsuyoshi, known as Musashigawa oyakata from 1981 until 2013
Dewanohana Kuniichi, known as Musashigawa oyakata from 1940 until 1960, and from 1968 until 1974